Kirill Igorevich Akilov (born 12 June 1989) is a former Russian professional football player.

Club career
He played two seasons in the Russian Football National League for FC Sibir Novosibirsk and FC Khimki.

External links
 
 

1989 births
Living people
Russian footballers
Association football midfielders
FC Sibir Novosibirsk players
FC Khimki players